The canton of Sainte-Florine is an administrative division of the Haute-Loire department, south-central France. It was created at the French canton reorganisation which came into effect in March 2015. Its seat is in Sainte-Florine.

It consists of the following communes:
 
Agnat
Autrac
Auzon
Azérat
Blesle
Chambezon
Champagnac-le-Vieux
Chassignolles
Espalem
Frugerès-les-Mines
Grenier-Montgon
Lempdes-sur-Allagnon
Léotoing
Lorlanges
Sainte-Florine
Saint-Étienne-sur-Blesle
Saint-Hilaire
Saint-Vert
Torsiac
Vergongheon
Vézézoux

References

Cantons of Haute-Loire